Colden is a town in Erie County, New York, United States. The population was 3,265 at the 2010 census. The town derives its name from Cadwallader D. Colden, a state senator. Colden is an interior town in the southeastern part of the county. It is one of the "Southtowns" of Erie County.

History
The town of Colden was organized April 2, 1827, from part of the town of Holland. One of the first settlers was Richard Buffum from Rhode Island. He purchased  from the Holland Land Company.

Geography

New York State Route 240 passes through the southwest part of the town.

Demographics

As of the census of 2000, there were 3,323 people, 1,262 households, and 951 families residing in the town.  The population density was 93.2 people per square mile (36.0/km2).  There were 1,337 housing units at an average density of 37.5 per square mile (14.5/km2).  The racial makeup of the town was 98.83% White, 0.03% African American, 0.21% Native American, 0.18% Asian, 0.09% from other races, and 0.66% from two or more races. Hispanic or Latino of any race were 0.42% of the population.

There were 1,262 households, out of which 32.4% had children under the age of 18 living with them, 63.7% were married couples living together, 7.8% had a female householder with no husband present, and 24.6% were non-families. 18.7% of all households were made up of individuals, and 6.2% had someone living alone who was 65 years of age or older.  The average household size was 2.63 and the average family size was 3.01.

In the town, the population was spread out, with 24.9% under the age of 18, 6.1% from 18 to 24, 29.9% from 25 to 44, 27.3% from 45 to 64, and 11.7% who were 65 years of age or older.  The median age was 40 years. For every 100 females, there were 102.6 males.  For every 100 females age 18 and over, there were 101.8 males.

The median income for a household in the town was $47,230, and the median income for a family was $52,460. Males had a median income of $39,524 versus $28,269 for females. The per capita income for the town was $22,510.  About 2.7% of families and 3.4% of the population were below the poverty line, including 3.0% of those under age 18 and 1.8% of those age 65 or over.

Communities and locations in Colden
Buffalo Ski Club – A semi-private ski resort (which includes the former Tamarack Ski resort, the former Sitzmarker Area and Buffalo Area). This is a member-owned club that is open to the public.
Buffums Mills – A historical location in the town.
Colden – The hamlet of Colden is in the west part of the town on NY-240.
Glenwood – A hamlet south of the hamlet of Colden on NY-240.
Kissing Bridge – A ski resort on NY-240.

Points of interest
WIVB-TV Tower, one of the oldest supertall TV towers in the United States.

Notable people
Tim Bender, snowmobile Hall of Fame rider and NASCAR driver
John M. Wiley, former US congressman

References

External links
Town of Colden official website
Colden history

Buffalo–Niagara Falls metropolitan area
1827 establishments in New York (state)
Populated places established in 1827
Towns in Erie County, New York